Scleria mackaviensis is a plant in the family Cyperaceae. It grows as a tufted sedge.

Description
Scleria mackaviensis has green spikelets. The plant flowers in spring and summer.

Distribution and habitat
Scleria mackaviensis is endemic to eastern Australia where it grows widely in the coastal regions of Queensland and New South Wales. Its varied habitat includes rainforest, scrublands, ridges, rocky hillsides and mountain slopes.

References

mackaviensis
Flora of Queensland
Flora of New South Wales
Endemic flora of Australia
Plants described in 1875